10th Avenue station (also called Asistio Avenue station) is a railway station located on the North Main Line in Caloocan, Metro Manila, Philippines, near the original Caloocan railway station.

The station was meant to be a part of a revived commuter rail system, built during the term of Gloria Macapagal Arroyo. After being constructed, no services to this station were ever provided until August 1, 2018, when it was opened for the Caloocan-Dela Rosa shuttle line. The northbound line is temporarily dismantled to give way for further works in NLEX Segment 10.1, and is currently a temporary single-line track. It was the terminus of said line until the clearing and recondition of the rails in the Caloocan station at Samson Road finished. The line has since been upgraded to terminate at FTI station, with this station no longer the terminus since September 10.

Due to nearly a decade of disuse since its construction, the station has been weathered and its gate barriers no longer functioning. It did not have running electricity until shortly after its reactivation. The gate barriers for the northbound street was made functional again along with its alarm horns thereafter.

Nearby landmarks
The station is near major landmarks such as the PNR Compound, PNR Caloocan Railway Depot, Poblacion Market, old Caloocan City Hall, Caloocan Central Judiciary Complex, La Consolacion College-Caloocan and Caloocan Cathedral. Further away from the station are the new Caloocan City Hall and schools such as Caloocan Science High School, Caloocan High School, Systems Plus Computer College and University of Caloocan City. Further east and west are motorcycle parts and shop dealers along Mabini and 10th Avenue itself.

Transportation links
The station is accessible by jeepneys plying routes from A. Mabini Street through 11th Avenue in Caloocan.

Rail skates and rickshaws occasionally run along the line, providing an alternate source of transportation, though before the construction of NLEX Harbor Link. This was the only line to access to the Caloocan railway depot.

The elevated expressway for NLEX Harbor Link is located immediately beside the railway station, with neighboring houses demolished for the construction.

Station Layout

References

Philippine National Railways stations
Railway stations in Metro Manila
Buildings and structures in Caloocan